Palouse Mall (originally Palouse Empire Mall) is an enclosed shopping mall in the western United States, located in Moscow, Idaho. Opened in 1976, the mall is anchored by Bed Bath & Beyond, Michael's, Old Navy, Rite Aid, Ross Stores, Target, and WinCo Foods.

The site is on the western edge of the city, near the state border with Washington.

History
Grading of the property began in October 1974; the first stores to open at the site were, from the east end, Kmart, Rosauers, and Pay 'n Save (now Rite Aid) drugstore, all in 1976. The mall had been in development  and the land on which it was built was leased from the University of Idaho. The land was previously owned and farmed by the Mix family for several generations. Developer Earl D. McCarthy died  and the ownership of the mall went to his children, Madeline Edgren and Mike McCarthy. The main enclosed portion of the mall opened that  featuring J. C. Penney and The Bon Marché (now Macy's) department stores, and Lamonts opened the following August.

Throughout the 1990s and into the early 2000s, the mall underwent several changes in anchor stores. Rosauers became Excell Foods 
 but was gone by 1992, then Price Connection, which closed in 1995. A year later, the mall structure itself underwent a renovation, held a grand re-opening in November 1997, and dropped the "Empire" from its name. The J. C. Penney store closed in 1998 and became Troutman's Emporium the same year.

An outparcel at the west end originally occupied by Ernst Home Centers became Office Depot and Hastings Entertainment in 1999. Gottschalks purchased the Lamonts chain in 2000. Emporium went out of business in 2003 and its space became Ross Stores two years later. Gottschalks closed in January 2007 and was torn down for Bed Bath & Beyond and Old Navy; Macy's closed in April 2016. In 2016, the Office Depot space became Staples while Hastings Entertainment went out of business. In 2017, the Hastings Entertainment space became Marshalls.

In September 2020, Target announced plans to open a store in the space vacated by Macy's. The store opened in October 2021.

References

External links

Shopping malls in Idaho
Shopping malls established in 1976
1976 establishments in Idaho
Buildings and structures in Moscow, Idaho
Tourist attractions in Latah County, Idaho